Maysionvara is a former air base in Russia located 22 km north of Suojarvi.  A 1962 US satellite analysis showed a 2560 m (8400 ft) runway with no aircraft on the field.  It was shown on the 1974 version of Department of Defense Global Navigation Chart No. 3 as having jet facilities.  It was likely either a dispersal field or an active military base during the early Cold War era and was closed by the 1960s or 1970s.

Almost nothing remains according to Google Earth and there is little evidence that anything was here.

References

Soviet Air Force bases